Olesya Persidskaya (born 16 December 1978) is a Kazakhstani alpine skier. She competed in two events at the 2002 Winter Olympics.

References

1978 births
Living people
Kazakhstani female alpine skiers
Olympic alpine skiers of Kazakhstan
Alpine skiers at the 2002 Winter Olympics
Sportspeople from Almaty
Alpine skiers at the 2003 Asian Winter Games